Georges Altman (21 May 1901 – 1960) was a French journalist and resistance fighter. During the Second World War he was involved in the Franc-Tireur organisation. Post-war, he was involved in setting up the left-wing party Rassemblement démocratique révolutionnaire.

Literary works 
 An editor of "l'Humanité"
 An editor of "le Monde"
 An editor of "Le Progres" (1940-)
 An editor of "La Lumière" (1940-)
 An editor of the "Franc tireur"
 Ça, c'est cinéma et le cinéma soviétique

1901 births
1960 deaths
French male non-fiction writers
20th-century French journalists
20th-century French male writers